Pallichan Nair is an intermediate Nair sub-caste, seen predominantly in Malabar and Cochin areas. They are found in Travancore in very low numbers. They are the palanquin / pallak bearers for the ruling dynasties, at some places for the Janmi Namboothiris and Nair chieftains. The conventional prayer 'Pana' was performed by Pallichan Nairs. They were also employed as warriors, and the Pada Nairs of Kavalappara Moopil Nair constituted mainly Pallichan nairs. Vaniya Nairs, Pallichan Nairs,  and Maniyanis, are Theyyam worshippers(The former being superior) and they have their own shrines for their Theyyams.

Pallichan and Vattakad were treated as an intermediate class of Shudras because there was neither inter-dining nor inter-marriage between the members of these subdivisions and the high caste Shudras.

References

Nair